Fun Lovin' Criminals are an American rap rock band from New York City. They are best known for their hit "Scooby Snacks", which features samples from films by Quentin Tarantino, and the song "Love Unlimited", which recalls Barry White's backing vocal group. Their songs often focus on life in New York City, as well as urban life in general. Their lyrics can be gritty or existentialist in nature, touching on topics such as organized crime and urban violence, but they are just as often humorous or satirical. The band gained a large following internationally, notably in Northwest Europe, around the release of their first two albums in the late 1990s.

History

Formation and first albums: 1993–1999 
The band was formed in 1993 by Huey Morgan, Brian "Fast" Leiser and Steve Borgovini after Leiser, who was already friends with Borgovini, met Morgan at the club where they both worked. They started playing together and would provide the entertainment for the club when a booked act failed to show up. It was during one of these stand-in gigs that they came to the attention of EMI and they were offered a record deal.

Come Find Yourself, the band's first album, was released in the summer of 1996 by Chrysalis Records and followed their single "The Grave And The Constant" (UK No. 72), which was released a month earlier, into the UK charts. The album also featured the UK Top 40 hits, "Scooby Snacks" (UK No. 22), "The Fun Lovin' Criminal" (UK No. 26) and "King Of New York" (UK No. 28). The subject of the latter touched on the imprisonment of Italian-American mafioso John Gotti, the wannabe gangsters emulating his style, and his fans and followers in his community that maintained his innocence. The biggest hit, "Scooby Snacks", features samples from films by Quentin Tarantino and a guitar sample from Tones On Tail song "Movement of Fear", interspersed with rap verses and a sung, anthemic, chorus. Come Find Yourself had a slow rise up the UK Albums Chart, finally peaking at No. 7 and spending well over a year in the chart, however it failed to make any impact in the US, despite the band appearing as musical guests on MTV's The Jenny McCarthy Show. The success of the album prompted the re-release of "Scooby Snacks" as a single, alongside a cover of the 10cc classic "I'm Not In Love", which this time reached UK No. 12.

100% Colombian, released in August 1998 by Virgin Records, had a far grittier sound to it tempered by three upbeat songs, and several downtempo tracks, including "Love Unlimited", a tribute to Barry White. "Korean Bodega", one of the aforementioned upbeat songs, was the biggest hit from the album, reaching No. 15, their second-highest placing single so far after the re-release of "Scooby Snacks".

In June 1999 the band played at Glastonbury Festival on the Pyramid Stage. Their December 1999 album Mimosa, released by EMI was a compilation album consisting mostly of laid back lounge style covers and different versions of earlier released tracks. While making reasonable sales, the album was their weakest selling album yet and remained so for some years. It was around this time, in 1999, that Steve Borgovini left the band. He was replaced by Maxwell "Mackie" Jayson. A permanent replacement was found in 2003 in the form of Mark Reid (aka Frank Benbini) from Leicester, United Kingdom, who had previously worked with the band as Jayson's technician.

Mainstream success: 2000–2008 

The band's third studio album, Loco, was released in early 2001. Back under EMI, the album had all new songs including the eponymous single, which became their biggest hit yet, reaching No. 5 in the UK Singles Chart. It was the only single release from the album to reach the UK Top 40, and its success helped Loco to reach No. 5 in the UK Albums Chart.

Their final album under EMI was a "best of" compilation called Bag of Hits released in 2002. It was released in both one and two disc versions, with the second disc featuring remixes of Fun Lovin' Criminals songs by other artists. EMI released this album against the wishes of the band, who were not happy with the two disc version. However, despite their objections it reached No. 11 in the UK Albums Chart.

After parting company with EMI the band was picked up by Sanctuary Records in the UK, under which they released their fourth studio album Welcome to Poppy's (2003). While it received strong, but not fantastic, music reviews it failed to live up to the commercial success of any of the previous albums, peaking at No. 20 in the UK Albums Chart. The best-selling single from the album reached No. 61.

EMI continued to release the band's back catalog, as well as unreleased songs on two more albums. The Fun Lovin' Criminals made no further releases until 2005 album Livin' in the City, still under Sanctuary Records. This was considered a love letter to New York with many songs extolling the virtues of the city.

In June 2008 they made their second appearance at the Glastonbury Festival, this time on the Jazz World Stage.

Releases, touring & Huey Morgan's departure: 2009–2021  
In April 2010 Classic Fantastic was released, kicking off a European tour which began in Manchester. Legal wranglings with their previous manager meant that this album was their first official output in five years, although they had played live during this period. Leiser and Benbini had produced much of the album in London, while Morgan recorded his parts in New York.

Classic Fantastic was the first album on Kilohertz, the band's own label, and signaled a new business model for the Fun Lovin' Criminals based on touring their live shows rather than relying on record sales alone. Singles from the album were the title track "Classic Fantastic" followed by "Mr Sun". The official video for "Mr Sun" was cancelled due to volcanic ash, and a montage of old home movies was used in its place.

The third single was the double A-side "We The Three" and "Keep On Yellin" featuring South London's Roots Manuva, released August 16, 2010. In July 2010, the band recorded a special series of songs with Roots Manuva. The project, dubbed "Criminal Manuvas", was recorded at Maida Vale studios for BBC Radio 6 Music; songs included a reggae version of "Scooby Snacks" and an alternative version of "Witness".

In September 2010, the band were touring, and they announced a live album: Fun, Live and Criminal via Pledge Music.

In March 2014, they released The Bong Remains The Same, a live concert video.

In February 2016, they released a deluxe, expanded edition of debut album "Come Find Yourself" to mark its 20th anniversary, and the band toured the album by performing it in full alongside some of their other tracks, throughout the UK and Europe, and at a number of festivals that Summer and into 2017.

In January 2019, The band released the follow-up to their "Mimosa" compilation, titled "Another Mimosa", which features covers of some of their favourite songs.

On 12 November 2021, it was confirmed on their official Facebook page, that frontman Huey Morgan had left the band.  The announcement was made after the band had cancelled their planned UK tour for October 2021. And on 25 March 2022, in a live instagram video between Leiser and Benbini, Leiser confirmed that relations between the band and Huey Morgan had become "strained", and with Morgan deciding that he didn't want to tour with the band, but instead continue presenting and DJing, which led to his decision to quit the band. Leiser later told The Star in August 2022, that Morgan wouldn't play much of the band's back catalogue live and that the band had "spent almost 10 years playing the same set to our fans", before revealing that "We got bored and some fans got bored too. It was one of the reasons cracks began to appear in our relationship".  Leiser also revealed that he is now the group's lead singer, and that Naim Cortazzi would be the band's new guitarist.  Leiser then announced a tour for September 2022, as well as new material for a forthcoming album. Brian "Fast" Leiser is now the only founding member left in the group. Morgan has not given any official statement regarding his departure.

New line-up and releases and activities: 2022 - present 

On 3rd September 2022, a new song called "Shake It Loose" was given a debut play on Dean Jackson's show The Beat, the song comes from their Roosevelt Sessions EP, which was released digitally on 9 September 2022.  The band toured the UK in September, with gigs in St Albans, Oxford, Leicester, London, Sheffield, Liverpool and Birmingham and then begun a tour of Europe, including dates in Greece, the Netherlands and Belgium before a tour of the US in November.

Musical style 
Rolling Stone described the music of Fun Lovin' Criminals as "a melting pot of local flavors: hip-hop, funk, blues and rock blended into a heavy, spliffy groove." BrumNotes magazine described the band's style as a fusion of hip hop and blues rock. The Chicago Tribune called Fun Lovin' Criminals a "soul-infused rock ensemble". AllMusic's John Bush described the band's style as "a blend of hip-hop beats, alternative style, and bluesy rhythms". getHampshire called the band "the world’s finest and only purveyors of cinematic, hobo, hip-hop, rock ‘n’ roll, blues-jazz, soul-review vibes." The Independent described the band's style as a "blend of New York rock, funk, hip-hop and even punk". The Belfast Telegraph placed their style within the rap rock genre, while Bush categorized them as an alternative rock and hip hop band.

Side projects 
Huey Morgan is a radio personality on BBC. Morgan has appeared on Jack Osbourne's Adrenaline Junkie, a boy racer show Slips, sat in for Jonathan Ross and Dermot O'Leary on BBC Radio 2, appeared in Soulboy as a Dick Van Dyke accented London record shop owner, voiced a character in the Scarface: The World Is Yours video game, and appeared with Liza Tarbuck on Liza & Huey's Pet Nation on prime-time Sky TV. Morgan now presents regular shows on BBC Radio 2 and BBC Radio 6 Music.

All three band members have released side projects. Benbini's band Uncle Frank has released an album, as has Leiser, albeit with some of his previous unreleased work. Both Leiser and Benbini have collaborated on myriad remixes as well as a full remix album in a reggae-dub style under the moniker Radio Riddler. Morgan has released an album, Say It to My Face, and toured with several acquaintances, including Benbini, as Huey and the New Yorkers, raising money for veterans in the process.

Members 
Current
 Brian Leiser - bass, keyboards, trumpet, harmonica, backing vocals (1993-present), lead vocals (2021-present)
 Frank Benbini  - drums, backing vocals (2003-present)
 Naim Cortazzi - guitar, backing vocals (2022-present)

Former
 Huey Morgan  - guitar, lead vocals (1993-2021)
 Steve Borgovini - drums (1993-1999)
 Maxwell Jayson - drums (1999-2003)

Timeline

Discography 

Studio albums
 Come Find Yourself (1996)
 100% Colombian (1998)
 Loco (2001)
 Welcome to Poppy's (2003)
 Livin' in the City (2005)
 Classic Fantastic (2010)

Compilation albums
 Mimosa (1999)
 Bag of Hits (2002)
 Scooby Snacks: The Collection (2003)
 A's, B's and Rarities (2004)
 The Ultra Selection (2005)
 Essential (2012)
 Another Mimosa (2019)

References

External links 

 

Alternative rock groups from New York (state)
American expatriates in England
American hip hop groups
Chrysalis Records artists
Rap rock groups